Porto Torres is a comune and a city of the Province of Sassari in north-west of Sardinia, Italy. Founded during the 1st century BC as Colonia Iulia Turris Libisonis, it was the first Roman colony of the entire island. The port of Porto Torres is the second biggest seaport of the island, followed by the port of Olbia. The town is very close to the main city of Sassari, where the local university takes office.

Toponymy 
Historically the settlement was founded with the Latin name "Colonia Iulia Turris Libisonis", composed with Colonia (name of the Roman settlements) Iulia (name of the Julia gens) Turris (litt. "tower", referred probably to a nuraghe built not so far from the town or to the Monte d'Accoddi) and Libisonis (referred to Libya, probably because in the same are there was a Phoenician trading outpost. "Libya" is the ancient name of the entire northern coast of Africa). After the fall of the Western Roman Empire the town was known simply as "Turris". During the Middle Ages during the Judicate of Logudoro the name was corrupted with "Torres" and after, during the Aragonese period, the town was known simply with the Catalan name of "Lo Port" (The port). During the Savoy reign it was known with the name of Portotorre (Porto+Torre; "Towerport").

Until the 1960s the town was commonly known as "Portotorres", and only after the official recognition of the status of city the name has officially changed in Porto Torres.

History

Prehistorian and Nuragic period

The Miocene 
In the frazione of Fiume Santo in 1994 has been find a lot of animal fossils presumably dated at the Miocene. Some 8/9 millions years old rests of Oreopithecus bambolii has been find in the same area. The discovering has started casually thanks to some hobbyist paleontologists that have noticed after some maintenance works in the near thermal power station the presence of some fossils in the excavation debris. In the area has been individuated 15 vertebrate species like giraffes, crocodiles, turtles, suidae and Mustelidae. Most of these animals like the Umbrotherium azzarolii were herbivorous, but some others like the Indarctos anthracitis were omnivores.

Prehistory 
Ancient human presence in the municipal territory of Porto Torres is certified thanks to many necropolis in the area. The altar of Monte d'Accoddi (very near to the town but in the municipality of Sassari) witness the human presence in that area during this ages.

Bronze and Nuragic Age 
Finds dated at this ages has been find in the Necropolis of Su Crucifissu Mannu. In this necropolis has been find two skulls with the presence of some sort of surgical procedure probably practiced to heal issues like migraines and tumors. Another theory is that this surgical procedure has been practiced for religious and/or magical purposes. Many nuraghes belong to this ages, and nowadays only 7 of these structures are in a well state of preservation. The Domus de Janas of Andreolu also witness the presence of the Nuragic civilization.

Roman period (46 BC – 455 AD) 
In ancient times, Turris Libisonis was one of the most considerable cities in Sardinia. It was probably of purely Roman origin, founded apparently by Julius Caesar, as it bore the title Colonia Julia. Pliny described it as a colony, the only on the island in his time, suggesting that there was previously no town on the spot, but merely a fort or castellum. It is noticed also by Ptolemy and in the Itineraries, but without any indication that it was a place of any importance. The ancient remains still existing prove that it must have been a considerable town under the Roman Empire. According to inscriptions on ancient milestones, the principal road through the island ran directly from Caralis (Cagliari) to Turris, a sufficient proof that the latter was a place much frequented. Indeed, two roads, which diverged at Othoca (modern Santa Giusta) connected Caralis to Turris, the more important keeping inland and the other following the west coast. It was also an episcopal see during the early part of the Middle Ages. There exists also the remains of a temple (which, as we learn from an inscription, was dedicated to Fortune, and restored in the reign of Philip between 247 and 249), of thermae, of a basilica and an aqueduct, as well as a bridge over the adjoining small river, still called the Fiume Turritano.

After the Western Roman Empire
It was partly under Genoese hands until the early 15th century, when it was conquered by the Aragonese. After a period of Spanish rule, it became part of the Kingdom of Sardinia.

Torres was separated from the Commune of Sassari in 1842. At the time, the area which had been built around the basilica of Saint Gavino joined the fishermen's community near the port to form the new Porto Torres. On 10 May 1942, Benito Mussolini visited the town. On Palm Sunday, 18 April 1943, the city was bombed by the Allies.

Geography

Porto Torres is on the north-west coast of Sardinia.

The area of the municipality is almost 10,200 hectares and is subdivided into two parts, almost equal in size.
One part includes the city, the industrial area, and the Roman ruins; the other consists of two islands, Asinara and the smaller Isola Piana. Since 1997, this part of the municipality is the Asinara National Park.

The morphology of "city part" is flat; the area of Porto Torres and the rest of north-west Sardinia is characterized by a Nurra plain, with some hill formations in the middle of it. Part of this hill formation is in the municipality of Porto Torres, the highest elevation being Monte Alvaro, rising to a height of 342 m above sea level. 

The communal territory is crossed by two rivers, Rio Mannu and Fiume Santo. The first flows along the edge of Porto Torres to the west, while the second runs near the city and was used as a navigable river as early as the days of ancient Rome.

Demographics 

Until the 1960s, the town was considered to be more or less like a large village. After that, thanks to industrialization, the population increased rapidly until the 1980s, when the local petrochemical industry managed by the "SIR – Società Italiana Resine" owned by Angelo Rovelli entered into a deep financial crisis.

Foreign residents 
In Porto Torres in 2019 there were 599 foreign residents, many of them from Africa and eastern Europe. The main nationalities recorded were:

 Nigeria: 61
 Romania: 56
 Serbia: 45
 Senegal: 34
 Poland: 32
 Ghana: 29
 Somalia: 24
 Ivory Coast: 22
 China: 20
 Mali: 17
 Other: 159

Economy

Tourism 
Starting in 2008, tourism has become a very important activity for the economy of the city. The town have several attractions, both natural and anthropic. The main attraction is the Asinara National Park. The Aragonese seaport tower is considered the symbol of the city and because of this it is one of the main tourist attractions. Other main attractions are the Roman bridge of Riu Mannu and the Basilica of Saint Gavinus. Due to the decline of the industrial sector, the tourist sector has started to become the leading sector of the local economy (despite the local industrial zone, that importance for the city remains high).

Industry 
Chemical industries support the modern economy of Porto Torres.

Plans related to industrial conversion are in progress in Porto Torres, where seven research centers are developing the transformation from traditional fossil fuel related industry to an integrated production chain from vegetable oil using oleaginous seeds to bioplastics.

Minor activities 
Fishing and farming activities are also practiced around the land.

Governance

Sister cities

Culture

Festivals 
At the end of August it took place the festival called "Suoni & Sapori", a festival that put together the tasting of local food and the listening of music composed by local artists. "La giornata dello sport" is an annual local festival that promote the sport activity for both children and adults. The "Festival Internazionale di Musiche Polifoniche Voci d’Europa" organized by the local polyphonic choir is an annual music festival of the town. The "Fisherman's regatta" is a competition where the fishermen try to fishing using only traditional early 20th-century equipment like rowing boats without any use of modern tools like the GPS tracker.

Main sights

Churches 
 Basilica of St. Gavinus, St. Proto and St. Gianuario (1080)

 Built using only hardstones like marble, porphyry and granite, is the largest Romanesque church in Sardinia built between 1065 and 1080 above the hill of "Monte Angellu" in one of the historical neighborhood of the town. The basilica was erected in the memory of St. Gavinus, St. Protus and St. Gianuario, beheaded during the 303 a.C under the governance of the emperor Diocletian and Maximian. Instead of the usual western facade and eastern apse, the cathedral sports two apses. The crypt holds several Roman sarcophagi.It was the main cathedral of the Roman Catholic Archdiocese of Sassari until 1441.
 Church of Beata Vergine della Consolata (1826)
 Neoclassic church built by the architect Giuseppe Cominotti (the same person who also built the Marquess's palace) in 1826. It was the main church of the historical seaport neighborhood, distinguished from the rural neighborhood of "Monte Angellu" situated near the Basilica of St.Gavinus.
 Church of San Gavino a Mare (1850)
 Also known as "Balai vicino" to distinguish it from the very similar church of Santu Bainzu Ischabizzaddu, it is built near the beach of Balai. In that place St. Gavinus, St. Proto and St. Gianuario has been buried after the execution, inside the building there are the three loculi of the saints.
 Church of Santu Bainzu Ischabizzaddu
 Also known as "Balai lontano" to distinguish it from the very similar church of San Gavino a Mare, it is built in the place where the three saints has been beheaded. Built with limestone, it seems to be a rebuild of a more ancient building. The name, literally "Church of the beheaded St. Gavinus " is because of, following the folk custom, in that place on 25 October 303 d.C., St. Gavinus was executed and, two days later, Proto and Gianuario did the same epilogue.
 Monumental cemetery of Cala D’Oliva
 An ancient cemetery in the island of Asinara. The historical cemetery of Cala d'Oliva host the ancestors of the inhabitants of Stintino; the town founded in 1885 by the residents of Cala d'Oliva after the institution of the exile colony in the island of Asinara, which forced them to abandon their homes of their historical settlement.
 Austro-Hungarian chapel of St Ephysius and St Gavinus (1915)
 Built by the austro-hungarians POW imprisoned in the exile colony of the Asinara in the period between 1915 and 1916. Artistically it was decorated by the hungarian prisoner György Nemess.
 Italian cemetery of Campo Faro (1916)
 During the WWI the island of Asinara was also a lazaretto for the italian soldiers affected by cholera during the campaign in Albania. In that period took place the history of the bolognese soldiers of the "Brigata Savona" died before they can reach the island during their transport in the hospital ship "Re d'Italia". To distinguish the italian soldiers corpses from the austro-hungarian it was built a cemetery in the area of "Campo faro" and it was called "Italian cemetery".
 Austro-Hungarian Ossuary (1936)
 An ossuary built in 1936 by the will of the Austrian government to keep the corpses of all the 7048 austro-hungarian unidentified soldiers died during the detention in the penal colony during the WWI because of typhoid fever and cholera.

Civil architectures 
In the Porto Torres's comprehensive planning there are many civil buildings both of private propriety and owned by the comune that are considered historically significant. These buildings witness the urban and the economic development of the city through the centuries until the 1960s; period of the local golden age of the industrial development thanks to the Italian economic miracle. Many of these architectures, especially the industrial ones, are not fully restored and visitable. 
 Marquess's palace, neoclassical palace built by Giuseppe Cominotti, the same architect of the not so far church of the "Beata vergine della consolata";
 Seaport museum (1872), an example of the industrial architecture of the 19th century. Originally used as a train station, now it is a museum;
 The Antiquarium Turritano museum.
 Junior school E. De Amicis (1912), An historical full-working school building built by engineer Eugenio Serra. It is a full architectural example of the 19th-century Italian schools;
 Ferromin S.A. industrial complex, built in the early 20th century, it has been the main industrial complex of the town for decades until the liquidation of the "Societá Anonima Ferromin" in the 1960s;
 Porto Torres Marittima station (1872), late 19th-century building, terminal of the "Ozieri-Chilivani-Porto Torres Marittima" railway;
 Industrial complex "Ex-cementeria Alba" (1957), built during the industrial golden age by the engineer Messina, it is a pure example of industrial archaeology;
 Industrial complex "Ex ferriera sarda" (1959), another example of the industrialization of north Sardinia, built by the influent entrepreneurs family of the Salis;
 Agricultural consortium of Via Sassari, An old consortium building that witness the agricultural past of the city. The historical storage buildings known as "I Granai" are now used as a mall;
 Hamlet of Cala d'Oliva, located in the Asinara it is the historical settlement abandoned at the end of the 19th century;
 Lighthouse of Punta Scorno (1854), located in the Asinara, it is an ancient full-working lighthouse, one of the most ancient lighthouses of Sardinia;
 Stoplight station of Punta Scorno;
 Royal Palace of Cala reale, the summer residence of the Savoy during their residence in the Asinara;
 Hospital of Cala Reale;
 Healthcare marittime quarantine station of Cala Reale, building used both as a lazaretto and a storage for the local healthcare.

Military architectures 
 Air-raid shelter "ex caserma dei carabinieri"  (1943)
 During the early WWII all the air-raid shelters in the town was barely used until may 1943, when the city was heavily bombed by the RAF. That air raid bombing, the worst that the city has suffered in the whole war period, was commonly remembered as "Palm Sunday bombing". For a long period of time this air raid shelter was left abandoned and in a heavy state of decay (same thing was for the air raid shelter "scuole de Amicis"), only recently has been restored and opened to the public.
 Air-raid shelter "scuole De Amicis"
 Situated under the 1900s junior school E. de Amicis: like many others air-raid shelters of the town, it was used during the world war II in order to protect the civilians from the several air-raids of the time. In the present days it is used as an exposition gallery.
 Artillery outpost of the Roman bridge n° SR414 (1873)

 An outpost used until the second world war composed with several military installations 
 Castle of the Asinara
 Also known as the "Castellaccio" it is an ancient medieval castle in the island of the Asinara. In the present days it is used as a fire protection outpost by the Asinara national park administration.
 Spanish towers (1323–1720)
Aragonese tower (1325)   
Tower of Abbacurrente (1571)
Tower of the Finance (1525)
Tower of Trabuccato (1609)
Tower of Cala d'Oliva (1611)
Tower of Cala d'Arena (1611)

 Asinara penitentiary complex (1885)
 Known as the "Italian Alcatraz", it became famous in Italy after a revolt happened during 2 October 1973. In the penitentiary of the Asinara has been detained the most dangerous criminals of the Sicilian Mafia, the Camorra, the Anonima sarda ant the Red Brigades. In more than one hundred years of activity the only prisoner who successfully escaped from the island penitentiary was the italian criminal Matteo Boe. During the WWI and the WWII it was used as an exile colony for thousands of POW and political prisoners. The penitentiary complex is composed by several sections located all around the island:
Penitentiary section "Bunker of Cala d'Oliva"
Penitentiary section of Cala d'Oliva
Penitentiary section of  Fornelli
Penitentiary section of Santa Maria
Penitentiary section of Tumbarino
Penitentiary section of  Campu Perdu
Penitentiary section of  Campo Faro
Penitentiary section of  Stretti
Penitentiary section of  Trabuccato
Penitentiary section of Case Bianche
Penitentiary section of  Elighe Mannu

Archaeological sites 
 Nuraghes
Nuraghe Biunisi
Nuraghe Monte Elva
Nuraghe Margone
Nuraghe Nieddu
 "Turris Libisonis" Archaeological park
Roman bridge of Rio Mannu
Palace of the "Re Barbaro" and domus of Orpheus
Baths of Maetzke
Baths of Pallottino (III secolo d.C)
Mosaics's Domus (I secolo d.C.)
 Other sites
Necropolis of Su Crucifissu Mannu
Domus de Janas of Campu Perdu (Asinara)
Hypogeum et Columbarium of Tanca Borgona (II secolo d.C.)
Hypogeum of Scoglio Lungo

Other 
 Main plazas
Umberto I plaza, Main plaza of Porto Torres where there is located the Town Hall;
Plaza of the "Martiri Turritani".

Natural areas
 Protected areas
Asinara National Park;
Marine protected area of the Asinara;
Sanctuary of the marine mammals.
Beaches

Beach of Fiume Santo
Beach of Renaredda
Beach of the Scogliolungo
Beach of Acque Dolci
Beach of Balai
Beach of the Scoglio Ricco
Il Ponte
Beach of Abbacurrente
Beach of Farrizza
 Main parks
San Gavino's park;
Robert Baden-Powell's park;
Pinewood "La Farrizza" .

Sports

Football 
Main football clubs:
Porto Torres Calcio (Serie D)
Turris
Polisportiva Dilettantistica Quartieri Riuniti (A.k.a. "Quartieri Riuniti")
Turritana

Tennis 
Main association:
A.S.D. Tennis Club Porto Torres

Basket 
Main associations:
GSD Porto Torres
CMB Porto Torres
Silver Basket Porto Torres
Balai Basket

Martial arts and combat sports 
There are many boxing clubs and martial arts schools. Sports like Karate shotokan, MMA, Boxing, Jujitsu, Krav-Maga and Self-defense are very appreciated and practiced by some part of the citizens.

Athletics 
Main association:
A.S.D. Atletica Leggera Porto Torres (associated with FIDAL)

Equestrianism 
Right below the ancient Roman bridge Porto Torres has a riding hall where the local A.S.D. Centro Ippico Equitazione Porto Torres practice horse riding.

Sport facilities 
 Sports area "Cittadella dello sport"
A 67.000 m² area which offer many sports.
 Main area ("Campo sportivo comunale" or "Stadio comunale")
 It is a multi-purpose stadium mainly composed with:
 1 football pitch of 60 x 105 meters (home ground of the A.C. Porto Torres)
Running track
Shot put area
Discus throw area
Hammer throw area
Javelin throw area
Pole vault area
High jump area
 Other areas
 Boxing club "Alberto Mura"
 Tennis club
 1 football pitch of 105 x 603 meters
 1 football pitch of 100 x 60 meters

 Palasport "Alberto Mura"
 A sport facility with a capacity of 1.600 people mainly used as an indoor basketball court.
 Skate park
 A 1.800 m² skateboard park with a bank ramp of 20°, a square-rail, a pyramid ledges and a quarter pipe.
 Football pitch "Angelo Occone"
 Football pitch of 100 x 60 meters situated not so far from the town hall.
 Other
 Artificial pine forest
 Called "Pineta la Farrizza", "Pineta Abbacurrente" or "Pineta Balai lontano", it is composed mainly of stone pines.
 Bicycle Path
 Starting from "Piazza eroi dell'onda" and finishing in the plaza of "Balai lontano", it offers a panoramic view of the sea.

Transport

Main roads

Train stations 
A railway operated by Trenitalia connects the town with Sassari and the rest of the island. The town has two train stations, one built at the end of the 20th century (considered as the main station) and one smaller and more historical built during the 19th century (referred as "Porto Torres marittima").

Seaport 

The existing port of Porto Torres, which is almost wholly artificial, is based in great part on Roman foundations. In the north-west of Sardinia, the harbor of Porto Torres is the biggest. The city has connections with the rest of the Italy, of Spain and France. Not so far from the harbor there is the Maritime Terminal (Stazione marittima). In the same area there is built the new passenger terminal (Terminal passeggeri; the building is still under construction). From the seaport there is also available a connection for the island of Asinara.

Destinations:

Public transport 
Porto Torres is part of the metropolitan network of north Sardinia (Italian "Rete metropolitana del nord Sardegna"). Due to this, the city is well-connected with nearly all towns via intercity autobus provided by ARST. Local rides are managed by the local public transport agency (A.t.p. Sassari).

Education

School 

The town has many state secondary schools and several state primary schools within it. In the urban area there is also a music school named in memory of the Italian songwriter Fabrizio de Andrè.

Being near the city of Sassari and thanks to the intercity lines managed by ARST, travel to the University of Sassari is very easy.

Libraries 
The "Antonio Pigliaru" public library is the only one in the town.

Media

Local newspapers 

 In...città;
 Il Corriere del Turritano;
 La Voce Turritana.

Radio stations 

 Radio del Golfo

Cinematography 

 Bonifacio Angius – "Ovunque proteggimi" (2018).

Notable people 

 Francesco Demuro
 Alessandro Frau
 Giuseppe Mura
 Andrea Parodi
 Fiorenzo Serra

References

External links

Municipalities of the Province of Sassari
Roman towns and cities in Italy
1842 establishments in the Kingdom of Sardinia
States and territories established in 1842
Populated coastal places in Italy